The list of symphonies in C-sharp minor includes:

References

See also
List of symphonies by key

C sharp minor
Symphonies